Money Heist (The House of Paper) is a Spanish heist crime drama television series created by Álex Pina. Netflix acquired global streaming rights in late 2017.

In the first four programming seasons, the Spanish TV series garnered a total of 30 nominations by winning 26 times.

In 2017 the series received two Award nominations (one victory) at the Fotogramas de Plata, other two (no victories) at the FesTVal and got an Award win at the Premios Iris. In total, therefore, five nominations and two wins.

In 2018 five nominations (no victories) at the Premios Feroz, five nominations (one victory) at the Spanish Actors Union, two nominations (one victory) at the Premios Iris, and the series got a victory in three others, at 46th International Emmy Awards, at the Golden Nymph and at the MiM Series, three nominations (no victories) at the Camille Awards, two awards at the Festival de Luchon and one nomination (no victory) at the Premios Fénix. In total, therefore, twenty-one nominations and seven wins.

In 2019 five nominations (five victories) at the Premios Iris, three nominations (one victory) at the Spanish Actors Union. In total, therefore, seven nominations and six wins.

In 2020 three nominations (no victories) at the Premios Feroz, two nominations (one victory) at the Spanish Actors Union and two nominations (no victories) at the Fotogramas de Plata, four nominations (three victories) at Platino Awards.  In total, therefore, eight nominations and four wins.

By years

2017

2018

2019

2020

References

External links
 Money Heist Awards on IMDb

Awards
Money Heist